The Cyclotron is a Canadian historical drama film, directed by Olivier Asselin and released in 2016. The film stars Lucille Fluet as Simone, an Allied spy in World War II who is trying to prevent German military officer König (Paul Ahmarani) from obtaining the technology that would enable the Germans to build an atomic bomb.

Effects technician Marc Hall received a Prix Iris nomination for Best Visual Effects at the 19th Quebec Cinema Awards in 2017, and a nomination for the Canadian Screen Award for Best Visual Effects at the 6th Canadian Screen Awards in 2018.

References

External links
 

2016 films
2010s spy drama films
Canadian drama films
Films directed by Olivier Asselin
World War II spy films
2016 drama films
French-language Canadian films
2010s Canadian films